MVF can refer to:
 Main Variable Figure, a type of fictional mobile suit in the anime Mobile Suit Gundam SEED
 Mamidipudi Venkatarangaiya Foundation
Man v. Food, a TV series
 Mouse virulence factor (MVF), a family of transport proteins belonging to the MOP flippase superfamily
 mvf, the ISO 639-3 code for the Peripheral Mongolian language